Anthony Clive "Tony" Morris (30 September 1962 – 1 August 2020) was a British newsreader for Granada Reports, produced by ITV Granada. He previously worked as a reporter and bulletin presenter for BBC North West Tonight and for a brief period was a reporter for the BBC national news.

Early life
Morris was born and brought up in the city of Portsmouth in Hampshire, but later moved to St Helens, Merseyside.

Education
Morris was educated at St. Luke's Church of England School, now known as the Ark Charter Academy, in the Southsea area of Portsmouth.

Life and career
Prior to being a television journalist and news presenter, Morris worked as a DJ and served in the RAF.

BBC

North West Tonight
Morris joined BBC North West Tonight initially as a reporter for the flagship programme based in Manchester, later going on to present shorter bulletins, usually weekend bulletins and the regional bulletin following the BBC News at Ten. For a brief period in his latter years with the BBC, he worked as a reporter for the national news, being based in London.

The Really Useful Show
Morris also co-hosted BBC Birmingham's morning programme The Really Useful Show, in 1997.

ITV

Granada Reports
In 2003, Morris joined ITV Granada as the new male co-anchor alongside Lucy Meacock for Granada Reports. This came following the departures of Tony Wilson and So Rahman. More recently, he had alternate lunchtime and late bulletins added to his role. He celebrated 10 years on Granada Reports in September 2013. The programme became the first regional news programme ever to win a BAFTA.

ITV Weekend News
In 2007, Morris stood-in on the ITV Weekend News, which followed Granada Reports.

Personal life and death
Morris had two adult daughters. He died at Bury Hospice on 1 August 2020, aged 57, after being diagnosed with kidney cancer in 2019.

References

External links

1962 births
2020 deaths
ITV regional newsreaders and journalists
BBC North West newsreaders and journalists
Mass media people from Portsmouth
English people of Grenadian descent
Black British television personalities
Deaths from kidney cancer
Deaths from cancer in England
Royal Air Force personnel